Zhasylkol Lake (or  Жасылкөл) is a lake in Kazakhstan. It is on the Northern slope of the Dzungarian Alatau ridge.

History
As a result of a catastrophic earthquake several millennia ago, a stone blockage was formed from the right slope, which blocked the course of the Kikozen river with a natural dam, forming a picturesque lake.

Description
Lake Zhasylkol is located on the Northern slope of the Dzungarian Alatau ridge in the valley of the Agynykatty river at an altitude of 1640 meters above sea level. People call it emerald. When the glaciers melt, the lake becomes a bright green color, especially if you look at it from above. The color of the lake's water depends not only on snowmelt, but also on the time of day and weather. In spring and summer, the water is muddy the color of coffee with milk, in autumn and spring, it becomes transparent blue. At noon, the water has a turquoise hue, with a blue sky, the water becomes the color of ultramarine, in cloudy weather it becomes leaden. , to the South, from lake Superior, the river takes Aguacate Eastern tributary of the river Ekiasha, which in turn is formed by the confluence of two small rivers – Western tributary of the river Balcony and East of a tributary of the Bark. The Kora river originates from the meltwater of the Satpayev glacier, which ends in the South with the Kara-Choki pass, along which the state border between Kazakhstan and the Republic of China runs in the latitudinal direction. Here grow fir, spruce, aspen, birch and poplar. It is here in Dzungaria that the most apple trees in Kazakhstan remain (49%), including the Sievers apple tree, which is the ancestor of all most domestic apple trees on Earth.

On the shores of the lake, deciduous groves have grown, which acquire a special beauty in autumn. The area of lake Zhasylkol is an excellent habitat for a large population of marals. Until the eighties of the last century, almost no human set foot here, which is not surprising, because the state border between China and Kazakhstan passes here. Traveling here is a great opportunity where virgin nature is evident with its magical views.

The object is part of the state national nature Park Zhongar-Alatau and has a favorable acoustic environment (e.g. silence and melodic sounds in nature). The best time to travel is from May to October

References

Sources
A. A. Akhmatov, A. G. Pozdeyev Guide to the Almaty region. Almaty, 2012
M. Zh. Zhandaev Nature Of The TRANS-Ili Alatau.Almaty, "Kazakhstan", 1978

Lakes of Kazakhstan